"Roses Are Red" is a song by Danish-Norwegian dance-pop group Aqua. It was released in September 1996 as their second single—their first under the name of Aqua, as their debut single had been released under the name of Joyspeed. The track would also later feature on Aqua's debut album, Aquarium (1997).

The single was successful primarily in Scandinavia, where it reached  1 in their native Denmark as well as No. 2 in Norway and No. 5 in Sweden. Unlike the subsequent singles from Aquarium, "Roses Are Red" did not achieve widespread distribution or airplay outside Scandinavia.

Track listing
Denmark CD single
 "Roses Are Red" (radio edit) – 3:33
 "Roses Are Red" (original version) – 3:43
 "Roses Are Red" (extended version) – 5:58
 "Roses Are Red" (club version) – 7:00
 "Roses Are Red" (club edit) – 4:14
 "Roses Are Red" (Disco 70s Mix) – 3:17
 "Roses Are Red" (radio instrumental) – 3:44

iTunes (21 April 2017)
 "Roses Are Red" (Svenstrup & Vendelboe Remix edit) – 3:22
 "Roses Are Red" (Scenstrup & Vendelboe Remix) – 5:22
 "Roses Are Red" (original version) – 3:43
 "Roses Are Red" (instrumental) – 3:42

Charts

Weekly charts

Year-end charts

Certifications

References

1996 singles
1996 songs
Aqua (band) songs
Eurodance songs
Number-one singles in Denmark
Songs written by Claus Norreen
Songs written by Lene Nystrøm
Songs written by René Dif
Songs written by Søren Rasted
Universal Music Group singles